Domjur railway station is a railway station on Santragachi–Amta branch line of South Eastern Railway section of the Kharagpur railway division. It is situated beside Howrah–Amta Road, Uttar Jhapardaha at Domjur in Howrah district in the Indian state of West Bengal. Total 24 EMU train stop at Domjur railway station.

History 
Howrah to Amta narrow-gauge track was built in 1897 in British India. This route was the part of the Martin's Light Railways which was closed in 1971. Howrah–Amta new broad-gauge line, including the Bargachia–Champadanga branch line was reconstructed and opened in 2002–2004.

References 

Railway stations in Howrah district
Kharagpur railway division
Kolkata Suburban Railway stations